SGL Carbon SE is a European company based in Germany. It is one of the world's leading manufacturers of products from carbon.

With 31 production sites around the globe (17 in Europe, 9 in North America and 5 in Asia), and a service network in over 100 countries, SGL Carbon is a globally operating company. The company headquarters is Wiesbaden, Germany.

The SGL share had been included in the German MDAX since 1995, and fell in the smaller SDAX in September 2014. Between March 2020 and March 2021, SGL Carbon has not been a constituent of the SDAX due to the low free float market capitalization. In 2021, the company generated sales revenue of €1007 million and employed 4,680 staff worldwide.

History
SGL Carbon AG originated in 1992 from a merger between SIGRI GmbH (Germany) and Great Lakes Carbon (USA) to share a company according to German law. (Some information about the history of Great Lakes Carbon can be found on the Wikipedia page for its founder, George Skakel).

SIGRI traced back to Gebr. Siemens & Co (Gesco), founded in Berlin as a subsidiary of Siemens AG in 1878. The company originally produced carbon. In 1920, the company set up a plant in Meitingen (Bavaria) and in 1928 merged with Planiawerke AG für Kohlefabrikation in Ratibor (Upper Silesia) to form the new Siemens Planiawerke AG für Kohlefabrikate. After the Second World War, the Meitingen plant of the Siemens Planiawerke AG für Kohlefabrikate merged with Chemische Fabrik Griesheim to form Siemens Plania Chemisches Werk Griesheim, the majority of which was acquired by Hoechst AG in 1953. In 1967, as a result of the merger with electrode manufacturing at Hoechst AG, Siemens Planiawerke AG für Kohlefabrikate also became a majority holding of the chemical company. There it was amalgamated with the Siemens Plania Chemisches Werk Griesheim and other enterprises of Hoechst AG. In 1985, it was renamed SIGRI GmbH and finally Hoechst AG acquired total ownership in 1989.

After the merger with Great Lakes Carbon, Hoechst AG retained a 50 percent stake in the new company. The remaining participation was sold in 1996 as part of the restructuring of the Hoechst Group. Since then, SGL Carbon AG is publicly traded.

In 2014, the company sold the rotor blade manufacturer SGL Rotec, which belongs to the group. In 2015, the US subsidiary "Hitco" was sold at a loss.

In the course of the strategic realignment in 2017, SGL Carbon sold its former core business with graphite electrodes and the business with cathodes, furnace linings and carbon electrodes. At the beginning of 2018, the company sold its shares in the joint venture SGL-Kümpers to the former joint venture partner Kümpers GmbH.

Also in 2018, SGL Carbon acquired the shares in the joint venture Benteler-SGL from Benteler AG and announced the gradual acquisition of BMW Group's shares in the joint venture SGL Automotive Carbon Fibers (ACF).

Group structure
As of October 2022, the company has the following structure:

The function of the Board of Management follows the principle of a management holding which acts as a legally independent entity (SGL Carbon SE).

The operating business is divided into the four business units Graphite Solutions (GS), Process Technology (PT), Carbon Fibers (CF) and Composite Solutions (CS).

Products/applications and markets
As of 2021, the mobility market segments (automotive and transport as well as aerospace) represent SGL Carbon's largest market. Industrial applications, which include growing segments such as semiconductors, make up the second-largest market, followed by the energy industry (including batteries as well as wind and solar energy). Further key customers are located in the chemical and textile fibers segments.

The individual business units' products, applications and customer segments are as follows:

Graphite Solutions 
The business unit Graphite Solutions (GS) operates primarily in the areas of graphite specialties. These include synthetic fine grain graphite blocks and expanded natural graphite as well as graphite anode material and materials for fuel cells. The main customer industries of the business unit's varied products and applications are the semiconductor, LED and solar industries, the battery and fuel cell industry, the automotive and transport segment as well as various other industries.

Process Technology 
The focus of the Process Technology (PT) business unit is on the construction, maintenance and repair of large systems for industrial applications. These can range from individual components and equipment to complete systems for the synthesis of hydrochloric acid as well as the concentration or dilution and absorption or desorption of a variety of acids. Technologies designed and manufactured by PT to that end include graphite heat exchangers, syntheses and columns as well as pumps and systems with a high resistance against corrosive media. The business unit's most important customer group is, consequently, the chemical industry.

Carbon Fibers 
The Carbon Fibers (CF) business unit bundles together SGL Carbon's material business based on carbon fibers, covering the entire integrated value chain from raw materials to carbon fibers to composite materials. The CF business unit controls the entire value chain, starting with the polymerization of the main raw material, acrylonitrile, through the production of carbon fibers and ending with the manufacture of fabrics. Apart from carbon fibers, the business unit's product portfolio includes precursor and acrylic fibers, non-crimp and woven fabrices as well as pre-impregnated materials.

Carbon fiber based materials enjoy increasingly high demand due to their unique properties such as low weight combined with high strength. Industries focusing on these properties, such as the automotive industry and wind energy segment, are key customers.

Composite Solutions 
Low weight combined with high rigidity and strength are the key benefits of the products provided by the Composite Solutions (CS) business unit. The unit focuses on the production of customer-specific components and tailor-made solutions made of composite materials based on glass and carbon fibers. Battery housing applications and GRP leaf springs as well as various types of carbon-based friction materials for the automotive industry are CS's main focus.

Locations
At the end of 2018, SGL Carbon had a total of 31 production sites (17 in Europe, 8 in North America and 6 in Asia). In Germany – in addition to its headquarters in Wiesbaden –t he company has a total of five production facilities, located in Meitingen (near Augsburg), in Bonn in Wackersdorf, in Limburg and in Willich.

In addition, SGL Carbon has an extensive service and distribution network with which it supplies its customers in approximately 100 countries worldwide.

Electrode cartel and antitrust litigation
In the field of graphite electrodes for electric arc furnaces, SGL Carbon was one of eight companies that operated a cartel and fixed prices between July 1992 and June 1997. The primary purpose of the cartel was to fix the price and allocate the volume of graphite electrodes sold in the United States and elsewhere.

SGL Carbon was among the companies accused and fined for operating as a cartel and price fixing in the carbon electrode business.  This was initially discovered in the US but later the European commission added their own case and fine.

Eight companies were fined under the EEC action, the largest were Germany's SGL Carbon AG and UCAR International (Now Graftech International Ltd. of the United States). In the finding the EEC states:

The Commission's decision comes after a thorough investigation, which established that the eight producers, which together account for the quasi totality of the production world-wide, operated a secret cartel during most of the 90s resulting in considerably higher prices than if the companies had competed against each other.

SGL Carbon received the highest fine of the eight conspirators, amounting to €80.2 million in Europe in addition to the $135 million in the United States.

To protect itself against damage payments for price fixing, SGL Carbon sought Chapter 11 protection in the United States. The Third Circuit adopted a "good faith" test and rejected a bankruptcy petition filed only because of the magnitude of anticipated antitrust claims.

Sponsorship
SGL Carbon was the main sponsor to the German Cycling team at the 2008 Olympics in Beijing and namesake of the football stadium from the German team FC Augsburg in the first German league from 2011 to 2015.

References

1995 initial public offerings
Chemical companies established in 1992
Chemical companies of Germany
Companies based in Wiesbaden
Companies listed on the Frankfurt Stock Exchange
German companies established in 1992